Reimond Tollenaere (June 29, 1909 – January 22, 1942) was a member of the Vlaamsch Nationaal Verbond (VNV), a right-wing Flemish nationalist party in Belgium. He was an active collaborator with Nazi Germany during World War II.

Tollenaere became active in the Flemish nationalist movement during his law studies at the University of Ghent. He was appointed as propaganda leader of the VNV and, in 1936, became a VNV member of parliament. During the German invasion of Belgium in May 1940 he was arrested by the Belgian authorities as a potential subversive and spent some time in prison in France. After being freed following the French defeat, he resumed his political activities in Flanders.

Tollenaere was active in encouraging recruitment for the Flemish Legion attached to the Waffen-SS following the German invasion of the Soviet Union in June 1941 and later enlisted himself. He was killed by friendly fire from the Spanish Blue Division in January 1942 at Kopsy near Leningrad in the region of Veliky Novgorod. After his death, he was "cannonized" by the VNV as a political martyr.

References

Bibliography
 Biographical Dictionary of the Extreme Right Since 1890 edited by Philip Rees, 1991, 
 

1909 births
1942 deaths
Belgian fascists
SS-Untersturmführer
Politicians from Ghent
Flemish politicians
Belgian collaborators with Nazi Germany
Belgian Waffen-SS personnel
Military personnel killed by friendly fire
Waffen-SS personnel killed in action
Friendly fire incidents of World War II

Prisoners and detainees of Belgium
Prisoners and detainees of France